BS College, Danapur also known as Bindeshwar Singh College is a degree college in Danapur, Bihar, India. It is a constituent unit of Patliputra University. College offers undergraduate degrees, postgraduate degrees and senior secondary education in arts and science and conducts some vocational courses.

History 
College was established in 1954. It became a constituent unit of Magadh University in the year 1975. After bifurcation of Magadh University, Patliputra University was established on 18 March 2018, by the order of the Government of Bihar, the college became a constituent unit of Patliputra University.

Degrees and courses 
College offers the following degrees and courses.

 Senior secondary
 Intermediate in Arts
 Intermediate in Science
 Bachelor's degree
 Bachelor of Arts
 Bachelor of Science
 Master's degree
 Master of Business Administration
 Vocational course
 Bachelor of Computer Application
 Bachelor of Business Management
 Master of Computer Application
 Travel and Tourism Management
 Library Science

References

External links 
 Official website of college
 Patliputra University website

Constituent colleges of Patliputra University
Educational institutions established in 1954
Universities and colleges in Patna
1954 establishments in Bihar